Yapı Kredi is one of the first nationwide commercial banks in Turkey, and is the fourth largest publicly owned bank in Turkey by its asset size. It was established in 1944 by Kazım Taşkent. Assets of the bank include credit cards, assets under management, non-cash loans, leasing, factoring, private pension funds and non-life insurance. The combined financial services network of the bank consists of 835 branches across the country with over 13 million customers. The bank offers vehicle loans, consumer loans, housing loans and commercial loan supports.

Yapı Kredi Emeklilik A.Ş is one of the largest pension and life insurance providers in Turkey and has been a major force in the growth and development of pension schemes and group insurance in the country. Its sister company, Yapı Kredi Sigorta A.Ş., is the second largest health insurer in Turkey. Together, the companies provide coverage to approximately 700,000 insureds.

History
Yapı Kredi was acquired by Mehmet Emin Karamehmet's Çukurova Holding in 1984, and Hüsnü Özyeğin was its general manager until 1987. In 2003 Çukurova Holding reached an agreement with the Turkish bank regulator to sell the majority of its shares in Yapı Kredi within two years. In 2005 the majority of shares in Yapı Kredi were acquired by the owners of Koçbank. Koç Finansal Hizmetler (KFH; Koç Financial Services, KFS), was an equal partnership between Koç Holding and Italian banking giant UniCredit. In 2006 Koçbank was merged into Yapı Kredi, leaving 80% of Yapı Kredi owned by KFS. In November 2019 Unicredit exited the joint venture KFS which controls the bank and acquired a smaller stake in the company.

See also

Lists of banks
List of banks in Turkey

References

External links

Sources 
 

Banks of Turkey
Companies listed on the Istanbul Stock Exchange
Banks established in 1944
Companies based in Istanbul
Koç family
Turkish brands
Turkish companies established in 1944
Şişli